Andrés Felipe Andrade Torres (born 23 February 1989) is a Colombian footballer who plays as a midfielder for Alianza Lima.

Personal life
Andrade was born in Cali in 1989. His father, Adolfo Andrade, also was a professional footballer who played for Deportivo Cali, the rivals of América de Cali, as well the Colombia national team.

Club career
Andrade started his career in América de Cali's youth team, and debuted for the first team on 15 August 2009 in a 0–1 defeat against Real Cartagena, coming on as a 46th-minute substitute for William Zapata. Andrade scored his first goal in a 1–2 defeat against Independiente Medellín on 26 September 2009, at 20 years of age. Andrade made a total of 24 appearances and scored 2 goals for América.

Andrade was transferred to Atlético Huila for the 2011 season, where he made a total of 40 appearances and scored 2 goals. In 2012, he was sold to Deportes Tolima, with whom reached 81 appearances and scored 14 goals. He made his first appearance in an international competition on 1 August 2012 in the 3–1 win against Deportivo Lara at the Copa Sudamericana. His first international goal was scored on 21 February 2013 in a 1–1 draw against Santa Fe at the Copa Libertadores.

On 7 July 2013 Andrade was officially transferred to recently crowned Mexican league champions Club América. He scored in a 3–0 win against Sporting San Miguelito in the CONCACAF Champions League, which was his debut for the club in an official competition. Andrade would make his league debut and score the final goal for América in the 4–2 victory over Atlante F.C. on 11 August.

León
On 8 June 2016 Andrade was transferred from America to León.

International career
He made his debut for the Colombia national football team on 2 September 2021 in a 2022 FIFA World Cup qualification (CONMEBOL) Cup qualifier against Bolivia, a 1–1 away draw. He substituted Juan Fernando Quintero at half-time.

Career statistics

Club

1Includes other competitive competitions, including FIFA Club World Cup and International Champions Cup.

Titles 
América
CONCACAF Champions League: 2015–16

References

External links
 
 
 

1989 births
Living people
Colombian footballers
Colombia international footballers
Colombian expatriate footballers
Association football midfielders
Club América footballers
Deportes Tolima footballers
Atlético Huila footballers
América de Cali footballers
Chiapas F.C. footballers
Club León footballers
Atlas F.C. footballers
Atlético Nacional footballers
Categoría Primera A players
Liga MX players
Footballers from Cali
Expatriate footballers in Mexico
Colombian expatriate sportspeople in Mexico